The Royal Australian Air Force (RAAF) is the principal air and space force of Australia, a part of the Australian Defence Force (ADF) along with the Royal Australian Navy and the Australian Army. Constitutionally, the Governor-General of Australia, is the de jure Commander-in-Chief of the Australian Defence Force. The Royal Australian Air Force is commanded by the Chief of Air Force (CAF), who is subordinate to the Chief of the Defence Force (CDF). The CAF is also directly responsible to the Minister for Defence, with the Department of Defence administering the ADF and the Air Force.

Formed in March 1921, as the Australian Air Force, through the separation of the Australian Air Corps from the Army in January 1920, which in turn amalgamated the separate aerial services of both the Army and Navy. It directly continues the traditions of the Australian Flying Corps (AFC), the aviation corps of the Army that fought in the First World War and that was formed on 22 October 1912.

During its history, the Royal Australian Air Force has fought in a number of major wars, including the Second World War in Europe and the Pacific, participated in the Berlin Airlift, Korean War, Malayan Emergency, Indonesia–Malaysia Confrontation, Vietnam War, and more recently, operations in East Timor, the Iraq War and subsequent intervention, and the War in Afghanistan.

It operates the majority of the ADF's fixed wing aircraft, although both the Australian Army and Royal Australian Navy also operate aircraft in various roles. The RAAF provides support across a spectrum of operations such as air superiority, precision strikes, intelligence, surveillance, and reconnaissance, air mobility, space surveillance, and humanitarian support. The RAAF has 251 aircraft, of which 83 are combat aircraft.

History

Formation
The RAAF traces its history back to the 1911 Imperial Conference that was held in London, where it was decided aviation should be developed within the armed forces of the British Empire. Australia implemented this decision, the first dominion to do so, by approving the establishment of the "Australian Aviation Corps". This initially consisted of the Central Flying School at Point Cook, Victoria, opening on 22 October 1912. By 1914 the corps was known as the "Australian Flying Corps".

First World War

Soon after the outbreak of war in 1914, the Australian Flying Corps sent aircraft to assist in capturing German colonies in what is now north-east New Guinea. However, these colonies surrendered quickly, before the planes were even unpacked. The first operational flights did not occur until 27 May 1915, when the Mesopotamian Half Flight was called upon to assist the Indian Army in providing air support during the Mesopotamian Campaign against the Ottoman Empire, in what is now Iraq.

The corps later saw action in Egypt, Palestine and on the Western Front throughout the remainder of the First World War. By the end of the war, four squadrons—Nos. 1, 2, 3 and 4—had seen operational service, while another four training squadrons—Nos. 5, 6, 7 and 8—had also been established. A total of 460 officers and 2,234 other ranks served in the AFC, whilst another 200 men served as aircrew in the British flying services. Casualties included 175 dead, 111 wounded, 6 gassed and 40 captured.

Inter-war period
The Australian Flying Corps remained part of the Australian Army until 1919, when it was disbanded along with the First Australian Imperial Force (AIF). Although the Central Flying School continued to operate at Point Cook, military flying virtually ceased until 1920, when the interim Australian Air Corps (AAC), with a wing each for the Army and the Navy, was formed as a unit of the Army. The AAC was succeeded by the Australian Air Force which was formed on 31 March 1921. King George V approved the prefix "Royal" in May 1921 and became effective on 13 August 1921. The RAAF then became the second Royal air arm to be formed in the British Commonwealth, following the British Royal Air Force. When formed the RAAF had more aircraft than personnel, with 21 officers and 128 other ranks and 153 aircraft.

As British aircraft manufacturers at the time were unable to meet Australian requirements, in addition to British production demands, the Australian government established the Commonwealth Aircraft Corporation in 1936 and purchased some American aircraft.

Second World War

Europe and the Mediterranean
In September 1939, the Australian Air Board directly controlled the Air Force via RAAF Station Laverton, RAAF Station Richmond, RAAF Station Pearce, No. 1 Flying Training School RAAF at Point Cook, RAAF Station Rathmines and five smaller units.

In 1939, just after the outbreak of the Second World War, Australia joined the Empire Air Training Scheme, under which flight crews received basic training in Australia before travelling to Canada for advanced training. A total of 17 RAAF bomber, fighter, reconnaissance and other squadrons served initially in Britain and with the Desert Air Force located in North Africa and the Mediterranean. Thousands of Australians also served with other Commonwealth air forces in Europe during the Second World War. About nine percent of the personnel who served under British RAF commands in Europe and the Mediterranean were RAAF personnel.

With British manufacturing targeted by the German Luftwaffe, in 1941 the Australian government created the Department of Aircraft Production (DAP; later known as the Government Aircraft Factories) to supply Commonwealth air forces, and the RAAF was eventually provided with large numbers of locally built versions of British designs such as the DAP Beaufort torpedo bomber, Beaufighters and Mosquitos, as well as other types such as Wirraways, Boomerangs, and Mustangs.

In the European theatre of the war, RAAF personnel were especially notable in RAF Bomber Command: although they represented just two percent of all Australian enlistments during the war, they accounted for almost twenty percent of those killed in action. This statistic is further illustrated by the fact that No. 460 Squadron RAAF, mostly flying Avro Lancasters, had an official establishment of about 200 aircrew and yet had 1,018 combat deaths. The squadron was therefore effectively wiped out five times over. Total RAAF casualties in Europe were 5,488 killed or missing.

Pacific War

The beginning of the Pacific War—and the rapid advance of Japanese forces—threatened the Australian mainland for the first time in its history. The RAAF was quite unprepared for the emergency, and initially had negligible forces available for service in the Pacific. In 1941 and early 1942, many RAAF airmen, including Nos. 1, 8, 21 and 453 Squadrons, saw action with the RAF Far East Command in the Malayan, Singapore and Dutch East Indies campaigns. Equipped with aircraft such as the Brewster Buffalo, and Lockheed Hudsons, the Australian squadrons suffered heavily against Japanese Zeros.

During the fighting for Rabaul in early 1942, No. 24 Squadron RAAF fought a brief, but ultimately futile defence as the Japanese advanced south towards Australia. The devastating air raids on Darwin on 19 February 1942 increased concerns about the direct threat facing Australia. In response, some RAAF squadrons were transferred from the northern hemisphere—although a substantial number remained there until the end of the war. Shortages of fighter and ground attack planes led to the acquisition of US-built Curtiss P-40 Kittyhawks and the rapid design and manufacture of the first Australian fighter, the CAC Boomerang. RAAF Kittyhawks came to play a crucial role in the New Guinea and Solomon Islands campaigns, especially in operations like the Battle of Milne Bay. As a response to a possible Japanese chemical warfare threat the RAAF imported hundreds of thousands of chemical weapons into Australia.

In the Battle of the Bismarck Sea, imported Bristol Beaufighters proved to be highly effective ground attack and maritime strike aircraft. Beaufighters were later made locally by the DAP from 1944. Although it was much bigger than Japanese fighters, the Beaufighter had the speed to outrun them. The RAAF operated a number of Consolidated PBY Catalina as long-range bombers and scouts. The RAAF's heavy bomber force was predominantly made up of 287 B-24 Liberators, equipping seven squadrons, which could bomb Japanese targets as far away as Borneo and the Philippines from airfields in Australia and New Guinea. By late 1945, the RAAF had received or ordered about 500 P-51 Mustangs, for fighter/ground attack purposes. The Commonwealth Aircraft Corporation initially assembled US-made Mustangs, but later manufactured most of those used.

By mid-1945, the RAAF's main operational formation in the Pacific, the First Tactical Air Force (1st TAF), consisted of over 21,000 personnel, while the RAAF as a whole consisted of about 50 squadrons and 6,000 aircraft, of which over 3,000 were operational. The 1st TAF's final campaigns were fought in support of Australian ground forces in Borneo, but had the war continued some of its personnel and equipment would likely have been allocated to the invasion of the Japanese mainland, along with some of the RAAF bomber squadrons in Europe, which were to be grouped together with British and Canadian squadrons as part of the proposed Tiger Force. However, the war was brought to a sudden end by the US nuclear attacks on Japan. The RAAF's casualties in the Pacific were around 2,000 killed, wounded or captured.

By the time the war ended, a total of 216,900 men and women served in the RAAF, of whom 10,562 were killed in action; a total of 76 squadrons were formed. With over 152,000 personnel operating nearly 6,000 aircraft it was the world's fourth-largest air force.

Cold War

Postwar 

During the Berlin Airlift, in 1948–49, the RAAF Squadron Berlin Air Lift aided the international effort to fly in supplies to the stricken city; two RAF Avro York aircraft were also crewed by RAAF personnel. Although a small part of the operation, the RAAF contribution was significant, flying 2,062 sorties and carrying 7,030 tons of freight and 6,964 passengers.

In the Korean War, from 1950 to 1953, North American Mustangs from No. 77 Squadron RAAF, stationed in Japan with the British Commonwealth Occupation Force, were among the first United Nations aircraft to be deployed, in ground support, combat air patrol, and escort missions. When the UN planes were confronted by North Korean Mikoyan-Gurevich MiG-15 jet fighters, 77 Sqn acquired Gloster Meteors, however the MiGs remained superior and the Meteors were relegated to ground support missions as the North Koreans gained experience. The air force also operated transport aircraft during the conflict. No. 77 Squadron flew 18,872 sorties, claiming the destruction of 3,700 buildings, 1,408 vehicles, 16 bridges, 98 railway carriages and an unknown number of enemy personnel. Three MiG-15s were confirmed destroyed, and two others probably destroyed. RAAF casualties included 41 killed and seven captured; 66 aircraft – 22 Mustangs and 44 Meteors – were lost.

In July 1952, No. 78 Wing RAAF was deployed to Malta in the Mediterranean where it formed part of a British force which sought to counter the Soviet Union's influence in the Middle East as part of Australia's Cold War commitments. Consisting of No. 75 and 76 Squadrons equipped with de Havilland Vampire jet fighters, the wing provided an air garrison for the island for the next two and half years, returning to Australia in late 1954.

In 1953, a Royal Air Force officer, Air Marshal Sir Donald Hardman, was brought out to Australia to become Chief of the Air Staff. He reorganised the RAAF into three commands: Home Command, Maintenance Command, and Training Command. Five years later, Home Command was renamed Operational Command, and Training Command and Maintenance Command were amalgamated to form Support Command.

South East Asia operations 

In the Malayan Emergency, from 1950 to 1960, six Avro Lincolns from No. 1 Squadron RAAF and a flight of Douglas Dakotas from No. 38 Squadron RAAF took part in operations against the communist guerrillas (labelled as "Communist Terrorists" by the British authorities) as part of the RAF Far East Air Force. The Dakotas were used on cargo runs, in troop movement and in paratroop and leaflet drops within Malaya. The Lincolns, operating from bases in Singapore and from Kuala Lumpur, formed the backbone of the air war against the CTs, conducting bombing missions against their jungle bases. Although results were often difficult to assess, they allowed the government to harass CT forces, attack their base camps when identified and keep them on the move. Later, in 1958, Canberra bombers from No. 2 Squadron RAAF were deployed to Malaya and took part in bombing missions against the CTs.

During the Vietnam War, from 1964 to 1972, the RAAF contributed Caribou STOL transport aircraft as part of the RAAF Transport Flight Vietnam, later redesignated No. 35 Squadron RAAF, UH-1 Iroquois helicopters from No. 9 Squadron RAAF, and English Electric Canberra bombers from No. 2 Squadron RAAF. The Canberras flew 11,963 bombing sorties, and two aircraft were lost. One went missing during a bombing raid. The wreckage of the aircraft was recovered in April 2009, and the remains of the crew were found in late July 2009. The other was shot down by a surface-to-air missile, although both crew were rescued. They dropped 76,389 bombs and were credited with 786 enemy personnel confirmed killed and a further 3,390 estimated killed, 8,637 structures, 15,568 bunkers, 1,267 sampans and 74 bridges destroyed. RAAF transport aircraft also supported anti-communist ground forces. The UH-1 helicopters were used in many roles including medical evacuation and close air support. RAAF casualties in Vietnam included six killed in action, eight non-battle fatalities, 30 wounded in action and 30 injured. A small number of RAAF pilots also served in United States Air Force units, flying F-4 Phantom fighter-bombers or serving as forward air controllers.

In September 1975, a group of 44 civilians, including armed supporters of the Timorese Democratic Union (UDT), commandeered an RAAF Caribou, A4-140, on the ground at Baucau Airport in the then Portuguese Timor, which was in the middle of a civil war. The Caribou had landed at Baucau on a humanitarian mission for the International Committee of the Red Cross. The civilians demanded that the RAAF crew members fly them to Darwin Airport (also RAAF Base Darwin) in Australia, which they did. After the Caribou arrived there, the Australian government detained the civilians for a short period, and then granted refugee visas to all of them. The Guardian later described A4-140 as "the only RAAF plane ever hijacked", and the incident as "one of the more remarkable stories in Australia's military and immigration history".

Recent history (1990–present) 

Military airlifts were conducted for a number of purposes in subsequent decades, such as the peacekeeping operations in East Timor from 1999. Australia's combat aircraft were not used again in combat until the Iraq War in 2003, when 14 F/A-18s from No. 75 Squadron RAAF operated in the escort and ground attack roles, flying a total of 350 sorties and dropping 122 laser-guided bombs. A detachment of AP-3C Orion maritime patrol aircraft were deployed in the Middle East between 2003 and 2012. These aircraft conducted maritime surveillance patrols over the Persian Gulf and North Arabian Sea in support of Coalition warships and boarding parties, as well as conducting extensive overland flights of Iraq and Afghanistan on intelligence, surveillance and reconnaissance missions, and supporting counter-piracy operations in Somalia.
From 2007 to 2009, a detachment of No. 114 Mobile Control and Reporting Unit RAAF was on active service at Kandahar Airfield in southern Afghanistan.
Approximately 75 personnel deployed with the AN/TPS-77 radar assigned the responsibility to co-ordinate coalition air operations. A detachment of IAI Heron unmanned aerial vehicles has been deployed in Afghanistan since January 2010.

In late September 2014, an Air Task Group consisting of up to eight F/A-18F Super Hornets, a KC-30A Multi Role Tanker Transport, an E-7A Wedgetail Airborne Early Warning & Control aircraft and 400 personnel was deployed to Al Minhad Air Base in the United Arab Emirates as part of the coalition to combat Islamic State forces in Iraq. Operations began on 1 October. A number of C-17 and C-130J Super Hercules transport aircraft based in the Middle East have also been used to conduct airdrops of humanitarian aid and to airlift arms and munitions since August.

In June 2017, two RAAF AP-3C Orion maritime patrol aircraft were deployed to the southern Philippines in response to the Marawi crisis.

In 2021, the Royal Australian Air Force commemorated its 100th anniversary. Later that year, on 29 November, the Hornet was officially retired from RAAF service, with a ceremony to mark the occasion taking place that day at RAAF Base Williamtown.

In January 2022, two RAAF P-8A Poseidon maritime patrol aircraft and one C-130J Hercules departed RAAF Amberley and Richmond to conduct aerial reconnaissance of Tonga in the wake of the 2022 Hunga Tonga–Hunga Ha'apai eruption and tsunami. According to Australian Defence News, the flights were to “help determine the extent of the damage [to Tongan infrastructure]… and inform future disaster support requests.”

Structure

Headquarters 
Air Force Headquarters RAAF – Air Force Executive
RAAF Air Command – Air Force Combat Forces
Defence Space Command – tri-service integrated headquarters for space operations

Force Element Groups 
Air Combat Group – air combat capability
Air Mobility Group – air lift and aerial refuelling capability
Air Warfare Centre – information warfare, intelligence and capability development
Combat Support Group – combat support and air base operations capability
Surveillance and Response Group – surveillance and reconnaissance capability
Air Force Training Group – air force training capability and development

Wings and squadrons

Flying squadrons

Non-flying squadrons

Wings

Personnel

Strength 
As of June 2018, the RAAF had 14,313 permanent full-time personnel and 5,499 part-time active reserve personnel.

Women 

The RAAF established the Women's Auxiliary Australian Air Force (WAAAF) in March 1941, which then became the Women's Royal Australian Air Force (WRAAF) in 1951. The service merged with the RAAF in 1977; however, all women in the Australian military were barred from combat-related roles until 1990. Women have been eligible for flying roles in the RAAF since 1987, with the RAAF's first women pilots awarded their "wings" in 1988. In 2016, the remaining restrictions on women in frontline combat roles were removed, and the first two female RAAF fast jet fighter pilots graduated in December 2017. Air Force has implemented several programs to assist women who choose a pilot career. Entry to the Graduate Pilot Scheme is open to women who are currently undertaking a Bachelor of Aviation (BAv). Once qualified, women pilots are able to access the Flying Females Mentoring Network. Men and women are required to undergo the same basic fitness tests to become a pilot; however the standards are lower for females. For some roles, the requirement cannot be adjusted for safety reasons.

Ranks 

The rank structure of the nascent RAAF was established to ensure that the service remained separate from the Army and Navy. The service's predecessors, the AFC and the AAC, had used the Army's rank structure. In November 1920 it was decided by the Air Board that the RAAF would adopt the structure adopted by the RAF the previous year. As a result, the RAAF's rank structure came to be: Aircraftman, Leading Aircraftman, Corporal, Sergeant, Flight Sergeant, Warrant Officer, Officer Cadet, Pilot Officer, Flying Officer, Flight Lieutenant, Squadron Leader, Wing Commander, Group Captain, Air Commodore, Air Vice-Marshal, Air Marshal, Air Chief Marshal, Marshal of the RAAF.

Officer insignia

Other ranks insignia

Uniforms 
In 1922, the colour of the RAAF winter uniform was determined by Air Marshal Sir Richard Williams on a visit to the Geelong Wool Mill. He asked for one dye dip fewer than the RAN blue (three indigo dips rather than four). There was a change to a lighter blue when an all-seasons uniform was introduced in the 1970s. The original colour and style were re-adopted around 2005. Slip-on rank epaulettes, known as "Soft Rank Insignia" (SRI), displaying the word "AUSTRALIA" are worn on the shoulders of the service dress uniform. When not in the service dress or "ceremonial" uniform, RAAF personnel wear the General Purpose Uniform (GPU) as a working dress, which is a blue version of the Australian Multicam Pattern.

Aircraft

Current inventory

Armament

Roundel and badge
Originally, the air force used the red, white and blue roundel of the RAF. However, during the Second World War the inner red circle, which was visually similar to the Japanese hinomaru, was removed after a No. 11 Squadron Catalina was mistaken for a Japanese aircraft and attacked by a Grumman Wildcat of VMF-212 of the United States Marine Corps on 27 June 1942. After the war, a range of options for the RAAF roundel was proposed, including the Southern Cross, a boomerang, a sprig of wattle, and a red kangaroo. On 2 July 1956, the current version of the roundel was formally adopted. This consists of a white inner circle with a red kangaroo surrounded by a royal blue circle. The kangaroo faces left, except when used on aircraft or vehicles, when the kangaroo should always face forward. Low visibility versions of the roundel exist, with the white omitted and the red and blue replaced with light or dark grey.

The RAAF badge was accepted by the Chester Herald in 1939. The badge is composed of the St Edward's Crown mounted on a circle featuring the words Royal Australian Air Force, beneath which scroll work displays the Latin motto Per Ardua Ad Astra, which it shares with the Royal Air Force. Surmounting the badge is a wedge-tailed eagle. Per Ardua Ad Astra is attributed with the meaning "Through Adversity to the Stars" and is from Sir Henry Rider Haggard's novel The People of the Mist.

Music
The "Eagles of Australia" is the official march of the RAAF and is played as a quick march when the RAAF bands perform public duties in the capital. Composed by the RAAF's Director of Music, Squadron Leader Ron Mitchell (who was also director of the Air Force Band), it was officially adopted as the RAAF's new march music on 23 March 1983, replacing the Royal Air Force March Past, which had long been the RAAF's march as well as the marchpast of other Commonwealth air forces. Subsequently, journalist Frank Cranston wrote lyrics to the march and a musical score was produced by September of the following year.

Roulettes 

The Roulettes are the RAAF's formation aerobatic display team. They perform around Australia and South-east Asia, and are part of the RAAF Central Flying School (CFS) at RAAF Base East Sale, Victoria. The Roulettes use the Pilatus PC-21 and formations for shows are done in a group of six aircraft. The pilots learn many formations including loops, rolls, corkscrews, and ripple roles.

Future procurement

This list includes aircraft on order or a requirement which has been identified:
 Up to 100 Lockheed Martin F-35A Lightning II (CTOL variant) with no fewer than 72 aircraft acquired to equip three operational squadrons. The remaining aircraft will be acquired in conjunction with the withdrawal of the F/A-18F Super Hornets after 2020 to ensure no gap in Australia's overall air combat capability occurs. On 25 November 2009, Australia committed to placing a first order for 14 aircraft at a cost of A$3.2 billion with deliveries to begin in 2014. In May 2012, the decision to purchase 12 F-35s from the initial 14 order was deferred until 2014 as part of wider ADF procurement deferments to balance the Federal Government budget. On 23 April 2014, Australia confirmed the purchase of 58 F-35A Lightning II fighters in addition to the 14 already ordered. Up to a further 28 aircraft may be acquired. The first two Australian F-35A Lightning II fighters were rolled out in July 2014, and began flying training flights with the USAF 61st Fighter Squadron in December 2014.
 A further seven Boeing P-8A Poseidons to be purchased and brought into service by the late 2020s, bringing the total number of aircraft to fifteen, was announced in the 2016 Defence White Paper.
 Six MQ-4C Triton unmanned aerial vehicles (UAVs) to expand the surveillance of Australia's maritime approaches, with the possibility of purchasing a seventh air frame. The drones will cost approximately A$6.9 billion over their entire life-time, with the fleet expected to be in service by late 2025. They will be based at RAAF Base Edinburgh however will regularly conduct missions from RAAF Base Tindal.
 A possible further two KC-30As to support the incoming P-8A fleet, which would bring the total number of aircraft to nine, was announced in the 2016 Defence White Paper.
 In November 2018, Defence Minister Christoper Pyne announced that Australia would purchase between 12 and 16 MQ-9s although the variant of aircraft had not been decided yet. In November 2019, the Australian Government announced the selection of the General Atomics Aeronautical Systems (GA-ASI) MQ-9B Sky Guardian as its preferred version of the Predator B for the RAAF's Project AIR 7003 medium-altitude long-endurance (MALE) armed remotely piloted aircraft system (RPAS) requirement.
In May 2020, Boeing Australia unveiled the Loyal Wingman, a joint partnership between the company and the RAAF. The Loyal Wingman is an unmanned aircraft incorporating artificial intelligence; the aircraft is the first of its kind to be produced in Australia and the first aircraft to be designed and manufactured in Australia for over 50 years.
 A$4–5 billion project to replace the BAE Hawk 127 lead-in fighter trainer was announced in the 2016 Integrated Investment Program that accompanied the 2016 Defence White Paper. The project has a timeframe of 2022 to 2033.
 Four MC-55A Peregrine SIGINT and ELINT intelligence gathering aircraft, based on the Gulfstream G550, in a A$2.5 billion procurement.
In July 2020, Prime Minister Scott Morrison announced that Australia would acquire the AGM-158C Long Range Anti-Ship Missile (LRASM) for the F/A-18F Super Hornet. In September 2021, Morrison announced that Australia would acquire the AGM-158B Joint Air-to-Surface Standoff Missile (JASSM-ER) for the F/A-18F Super Hornet and F-35A fighters.
 A$4.9–7.3 billion project to acquire a Medium Range Ground Based Air Defence capability to defend deployed airfields, command centres and other valuable assets from enemy air attack. The project has a timeframe of mid to late 2020s. The project had been named Medium Range Air and Missile Defence in the 2016 Integrated Investment Program. The project was also renamed and renumbered to AIR6502 Phase 1 from AIR6500 Phase 2 for the 2020 Force Structure Plan.

See also

Airfield Defence Guards
Australian Air Force Cadets
Australian Air Traffic Control
Australian Defence Force ranks and insignia
Royal Australian Air Force Maritime Section
Royal Australian Air Force VIP aircraft

Lists
List of air forces
List of current Royal Australian Air Force aircraft
List of aircraft of the Royal Australian Air Force
List of Royal Australian Air Force aircraft squadrons
List of Royal Australian Air Force independent aircraft flights
List of Royal Australian Air Force installations
List of ships of the Royal Australian Air Force

Memorials and museums
List of Australian military memorials
Royal Australian Air Force Memorial, Brisbane
Royal Australian Air Force Memorial, Canberra

References

Citations

Bibliography

 
 
 

 

 Grant, James Ritchie. "Anti-Clockwise: Australia the Wrong Way". Air Enthusiast, No. 82, July–August 1999, pp. 60–63. 
 Green, William and Gordon Swanborough. "Annals of the Gauntlet". Air Enthusiast Quarterly, No. 2, n.d., pp. 163–176.

Further reading

External links 

 
 
 RAAF Air Power Doctrine

 
Military units and formations established in 1921
Organisations based in Australia with royal patronage
1921 establishments in Australia
Cold War history of Australia